The Paseo del Prado is one of the main boulevards in Madrid, Spain. It runs north–south between the Plaza de Cibeles and the Plaza del Emperador Carlos V (also known as Plaza de Atocha), with the Plaza de Cánovas del Castillo (the location of the Fuente de Neptuno, and of the Ritz and Palace five-star hotels) lying approximately in the middle. The Paseo del Prado forms the southern end of the city's central axis (which continues to the north of Cibeles as the Paseo de Recoletos, and further north as the Paseo de la Castellana). It enjoys the status of Bien de Interés Cultural (BIC), and as part of a combined UNESCO World Heritage Site with Buen Retiro Park.

Description 
This densely tree-lined, wide and central avenue is a landmark for the city residents and the location of important cultural and tourist spots in the city, including the so-called Golden Triangle of Art, which encompasses three museums: the Prado Museum (with highlights such as Diego Velázquez's Las Meninas and Francisco de Goya's La maja vestida and La maja desnuda), the Thyssen-Bornemisza Museum (housing a collection that spans eight centuries of European painting), and the Reina Sofia Museum (where Pablo Picasso's Guernica hangs, among a collection of 20th-century art). In the vicinity are the Parque del Buen Retiro, the Casón del Buen Retiro (hosting the 19th-century collection of the Prado Museum), CaixaForum Madrid, the headquarters of the Real Academia Española (the Spanish language academy), the Bolsa de Madrid (the city's stock exchange), and the Congreso de los Diputados (the national congress).

The Paseo del Prado boulevard includes several monuments and enclosures that are of historical and artistic interest, erected in the eighteenth century for the Hall of Prado urban project.  Numerous ornamental and landscaping grounds were constructed for this project. The highlights of this project include the Villanueva Building (the Prado Museum's main building), the Royal Botanical Gardens and three sculptural water fountains designed by Ventura Rodriguez, depicting Neptune, Cibeles and Apollo.

A controversial project of thorough reform and revitalization of the Paseo del Prado and the Paseo de Recoletos, known as Plan Especial Recoletos-Prado and authored by an international team of architects led by Álvaro Siza, was approved by the city council on 23 June 2005, but as of December 2010 its environmental impact study is still underway and reconstruction has not been initiated.

Notable structures

References

External links

 Paseo del Prado and Buen Retiro, a landscape of Arts and Sciences UNESCO collection on Google Arts and Culture
The Paseo del Prado
Architectural review by a+t architecture publishers

 
Streets in Madrid
Art gallery districts
Museo del Prado
Bien de Interés Cultural landmarks in Madrid